Carl Louis Ferdinand von Lindemann (12 April 1852 – 6 March 1939) was a German mathematician, noted for his proof, published in 1882, that  (pi) is a transcendental number, meaning it is not a root of any polynomial with rational coefficients.

Life and education 
Lindemann was born in Hanover, the capital of the Kingdom of Hanover. His father, Ferdinand Lindemann, taught modern languages at a Gymnasium in Hanover. His mother, Emilie Crusius, was the daughter of the Gymnasium's headmaster. The family later moved to Schwerin, where young Ferdinand attended school.

He studied mathematics at Göttingen, Erlangen, and Munich. At Erlangen he received a doctorate, supervised by Felix Klein, on non-Euclidean geometry. Lindemann subsequently taught in Würzburg and at the University of Freiburg. During his time in Freiburg, Lindemann devised his proof that  is a transcendental number (see Lindemann–Weierstrass theorem). After his time in Freiburg, Lindemann transferred to the University of Königsberg. While a professor in Königsberg, Lindemann acted as supervisor for the doctoral theses of the mathematicians David Hilbert, Hermann Minkowski, and Arnold Sommerfeld.

Transcendence proof 
His methods were similar to those used nine years earlier by Charles Hermite to show that e, the base of natural logarithms, is transcendental. Before the publication of Lindemann's proof, it was known that if  was transcendental, with Johann Heinrich Lambert as the first to prove  being irrational in the 1760s, along with the impossibility to square the circle by compass and straightedge.

References

External links

 
 
 Lindemann, F.  "Über die Zahl ", Mathematische Annalen 20 (1882): pp. 213–225.

1852 births
1939 deaths
19th-century German mathematicians
20th-century German mathematicians
Squaring the circle
Number theorists
Scientists from Hanover
People from the Kingdom of Hanover
University of Göttingen alumni
University of Erlangen-Nuremberg alumni
Ludwig Maximilian University of Munich alumni
Academic staff of the University of Königsberg